A whole note (American) or semibreve (British) in musical notation is a single note equivalent to or lasting as long as two half notes or four quarter notes.

Description 
The whole note or semibreve has a note head in the shape of a hollow oval—like a half note (or minim)—but with no note stem (see Figure 1). Since it is equal to four quarter notes, it occupies the entire length of a measure in  time.

Other notes are multiples or fractions of the whole note. For example, a double whole note (or breve) lasts twice the duration of the whole note, a half note lasts one half the duration, and a quarter note (or crotchet) lasts one quarter the duration.

A related symbol is the whole rest (or semibreve rest), which signifies a rest for the duration of a whole note. Whole rests are drawn as filled-in rectangles generally hanging under the second line from the top of a musical staff, though they may occasionally be put under a different line (or ledger line) in more complicated polyphonic passages, or when two instruments or vocalists are written on one staff.

The whole note may also be used to denote a whole measure in music of free rhythm, such as Anglican chant, irrespective of the time of the measure.

History 
The whole note symbol is first found in music notation from the late thirteenth century . It derives from the round, stemless  of mensural notation, hence the origin of the British name.

Nomenclature 

The British term is taken from Italian semibreve, itself built upon Latin semi- "half" and brevis "short." The American whole note is a calque of the German . Some languages derive the name of the note from its round shape, such as Catalan rodona, French ronde, and Spanish redonda. The Greek name means "whole". The Chinese, Japanese, Korean, and Vietnamese names mean "whole note".

See also 
 List of musical symbols

References 
 

Note values